Gephyrin is a protein that in humans is encoded by the GPHN gene.

This gene encodes a neuronal assembly protein that anchors inhibitory neurotransmitter receptors to the postsynaptic cytoskeleton via high affinity binding to a receptor subunit domain and tubulin dimers. In nonneuronal tissues, the encoded protein is also required for molybdenum cofactor biosynthesis. Mutations in this gene may be associated with the neurological condition hyperekplexia and also lead to molybdenum cofactor deficiency.

Gene 

Numerous alternatively spliced transcript variants encoding different isoforms have been described; however, the full-length nature of all transcript variants is not currently known. The production of alternatively spliced variants is affected by noncoding regions within the gene. A ‘yin-yang’ noncoding sequence pair encompassing gephyrin has been identified. These sequences are opposites of each other - consisting of hundreds of divergent nucleotide states.  Both of these patterns are uniquely human and evolved rapidly after splitting from their ancestral DNA pattern. The gephyrin yin and yang sequences are prevalent today in populations representing every major human ancestry.

Function 

Gephyrin is a 93kDa multi-functional  protein that is a component of the postsynaptic protein network of inhibitory synapses. It consists of 3 domains: N terminal G domain, C terminal E domain, and a large unstructured linker domain which connects the two. Although there are structures available for trimeric G and dimeric E domains, there is no structure available for the full length protein, which may be due to the large unstructured region which makes the protein hard to crystallize. But a recent study of the full length gephyrin by small-angle X-ray scattering shows that it predominantly forms trimers, and that because of its long linker region, it can exist in either a compact state or either of two extended states.

Positive antibody staining for gephyrin at a synapse is most of the time consistent with the presence of glycine and/or GABAA receptors. Nevertheless, some exceptions can occur like in neurons of Dorsal Root Ganglions where gephyrin is absent despite the presence of GABAA receptors. Gephyrin is considered a major scaffolding protein at inhibitory synapses, analogous in its function to that of PSD-95 at glutamatergic synapses.  Gephyrin was identified by its interaction with the glycine receptor, the main receptor protein of inhibitory synapses in the spinal cord and brainstem. In addition to its interaction with the glycine receptor, recent publications have shown that gephyrin also interacts with the intracellular loop between the transmembrane helices TM3 and TM4 of alpha and beta subunits of the GABAA receptor.

Gephyrin displaces GABA receptors from the GABARAP/P130 complex, then brings the receptors to the synapse. Once at the synapse, the protein binds to collybistin and neuroligin 2. In cells, gephyrin appears to form oligomers of at least three subunits. Several splice variants have been described that prevent this oligomerization without influencing the affinity for receptors. They nevertheless affect the composition of inhibitory synapses and can even play a role in diseases like epilepsy.

The gephyrin protein is also required for insertion of molybdenum into molybdopterin.

As aforementioned, gephyrin also catalyzes terminal two steps of Moco biosynthesis. In the penultimate step, N-terminal G domain adenylate the apo form of the molybdopterin to form the intermediate adenylated molybdopterin. In the terminal step, the C-terminal E domain catalyzes the deadenylation and also the metal insertion mechanism.

Clinical significance 

Humans with temporal lobe epilepsy have been found to have abnormally low levels of gephyrin in their temporal lobes. In animal models, a total lack of gephyrin results in stiff muscles and death immediately after birth. Stiff muscles are also a symptom of startle disease, that can be caused by a mutation in the gephyrin gene. And if a person produces auto-antibodies against gephyrin, this can even result in stiff person syndrome.

Yin-yang sequences 

At some point in human history, there was a DNA sequence encompassing gephyrin that split and followed two divergent evolutionary paths. These types of splits can occur when two populations become isolated from each other or when a chromosomal region does not experience recombination events. The two sequences that split from the ancestral sequence each acquired more than a hundred mutations that subsequently became common. This happened in a relatively short time on an evolutionary scale, as hundreds of mutations were fixed in distinct ‘yin’ and ‘yang’ sequences prior to human migration to Asia. It has been reported that currently Asians carry nearly equal numbers of yin and yang sequences and global populations representing every major human ancestry possess both yin and yang sequences. The existence of this massive yin-yang pattern suggests that two completely divergent evolutionary paths rapidly progressed during human history, presumably achieving the common goal of enhancing regulation of gephyrin.

Interactions 

GPHN has been shown to interact with Mammalian target of rapamycin and ARHGEF9.

References

Further reading

External links